The seventh and final season of the American science fiction television series Star Trek: The Next Generation commenced airing in broadcast syndication in the United States on September 20, 1993, and concluded on May 23, 1994, after airing 26 episodes. Set in the 24th century, the series follows the adventures of the crew of the Starfleet starship Enterprise-D.

The season begins with the crew defeating Lore and his group of rogue Borg, resulting in the disassembly of Lore. It continued this theme of family history with most of the episodes. After dealing with Lore, Data also confronts the realization that his "mother" is still alive ("Inheritance"). In "Interface", Geordi attempts to save his mother from a damaged ship and is forced to deal with his loss. Worf meets a future version of his son, Alexander, in "Firstborn" and his foster brother in "Homeward".

Both Troi and Dr. Crusher confront old family secrets in "Dark Page" and "Sub Rosa". Picard also faces challenges with a son he never knew he had in "Bloodlines" and his relationship with his family – past, present, and future – in the series finale "All Good Things..."

The series ends with Q concluding his trial of humanity, giving Picard an opportunity to save all of humankind.

This season was nominated for a Primetime Emmy Award for Outstanding Drama Series, making Star Trek: The Next Generation the first (and, as of 2020, only) syndicated series to be nominated for the award.

Cast

Recurring Characters

Episodes

In the following table, episodes are listed by the order in which they aired.

Footnotes

External links
 Episode guide  at Star Trek.com

Star Trek: The Next Generation seasons
1993 American television seasons
1994 American television seasons